Collobiano is a comune (municipality) in the Province of Vercelli in the Italian region Piedmont, located about  northeast of Turin and about  northwest of Vercelli.

Collobiano borders the following municipalities: Albano Vercellese, Casanova Elvo, Olcenengo, Oldenico, Quinto Vercellese, and Villarboit.

References

Cities and towns in Piedmont

be:Калаб'яна